Una Obiose Kriston Nwajei (born 7 March 1977) is a Nigerian-born English former footballer. She played as a striker for Amazon Grimstad and has represented England at international level.

Club career
Nwajei began playing for Southampton Saints in the FA Women's Premier League National Division while attending Southampton Institute. Her form won her an international call-up and a professional contract with Fulham early in the 2002–03 season. When Fulham won the treble that season then reverted to semi-pro status, Nwajei followed teammate Margunn Haugenes to Norwegian club Amazon Grimstad.

She remained at Amazon Grimstad thereafter, except for a season at Team Strømmen (now called LSK Kvinner) in 2009. She was Strømmen's top goalscorer with 13 goals.

International career
Nwajei was called up by England in January 2002. She made her debut on 1 March 2002 in a 3–1 Algarve Cup defeat by Norway.

Personal life
Nwajei learnt to play football during her childhood in Nigeria. She graduated with a 2:1 in Business and IT from Southampton Institute in 2002.

References

Living people
1977 births
Alumni of Solent University
Fulham L.F.C. players
Southampton Saints L.F.C. players
English women's footballers
FA Women's National League players
England women's international footballers
Expatriate women's footballers in Norway
Nigerian emigrants to the United Kingdom
English expatriate sportspeople in Norway
Toppserien players
Women's association football forwards